The 2011 Oceania Youth Athletics Championships were held at the Sydney Olympic Park Athletic Centre in Homebush, New South Wales, Australia, between March 10–14, 2011. They were held together with the 2011 Australian Junior Athletics Championships (U14 to U20). A total of 40 events were contested, 20 by boys and 20 by girls.

Medal summary
Complete results can be found on the websites of the Athletics Australia, and of the World Junior Athletics History.

Boys under 18 (Youth)

Girls under 18 (Youth)

Medal table (unofficial)

Participation (unofficial)
An unofficial count yields the number of about 356 athletes from 3 countries. 331 athletes were from the 8 Australian States and Territories:

 
 
 (1)
 
 
 
 
 

and 25 athletes from a combined team "Oceania" composed of 2 other OAA member countries:

 (2)
 (23)

References

Oceania Youth Athletics Championships
International athletics competitions hosted by Australia
Oceania Youth
2011 in Australian sport
Youth sport in Australia
2011 in youth sport
March 2011 sports events in Australia